The Home Squadron was part of the United States Navy in the mid-19th century. Organized as early as 1838, ships were assigned to protect coastal commerce, aid ships in distress, suppress piracy and the Atlantic slave trade, make coastal surveys, and train ships to relieve others on distant stations. It was discontinued in 1861 after the outbreak of the American Civil War, when the Union blockade forced a reassignment of ships to close off Southern ports.

History

Mexican–American War
During the Mexican–American War the ships of the Home Squadron, commanded by Commodore David Conner, USN fought in several engagements against Mexican forces. Many of the Home Squadron vessels were attached to vice commander Commodore Matthew C. Perry's Mosquito Fleet which was involved in the battles of Tuxpan, Tabasco, Villahermosa and Veracruz. No ship-to-ship combat occurred though several merchant vessels were captured, the Home Squadron primarily operated against Mexican coastal forts and artillery batteries.

Reform War

Since the Mexican War of Independence ending in 1821, Mexican liberals, a political party which evolved from the Masonic Lodge of the York Rite created by Joel R. Poinsett who was an American Diplomat sent by President James Monroe to secretly propose the purchase of the northern provinces from the First Mexican Empire; and the conservative party—which as its name indicates, had as its principal objective was to preserve the traditions and customs of the nation—were constantly in conflict at each other throughout the first decades of the existence of Mexico.

The continuous friction led to a major civil war known as the Reform War from 1858 to 1860 and political instability, which the U.S. government under James Buchanan saw as a great opportunity to further expand the U.S. territory limits southwards (after the acquisition through war of California, Arizona, New Mexico, Nevada, Utah, most of Colorado, south Wyoming, and a fraction of Kansas and Oklahoma. For this reason and based upon the Doctrine Monroe, the U.S government sent an emissary to discuss with Juarez's liberal party the possibility to cede the Baja California peninsula to the United States, which he promptly accepted in exchange of diplomatic, economic and military support to counteract the conservative power that at that point, had the full support of the majority of the Mexican people, and was in control of the entire country with the exception of the cities of Morelia and Veracruz.

During the Second Siege of Veracruz in 1859, a Mexican officer named Thomas M. Marin of the Mexican Navy purchased vessels in Cuba, that he armed and equipped to sail back to Veracruz to assist and supply General Miramon's siege of the held city. The Liberal Mexican government declared Marin's fleet to be that of pirates so ships of the Home Squadron were ordered to intervene and arrest Marin. Two of Marin's ships, the steamer General Miramon and the sloop-of-war Marquis of Havana, arrived at their rendezvous off Anton Lizardo. They were spotted by a Mexican fort and the frigate USS Savannah which ordered the sloop-of-war USS Saratoga to intervene with help from two steamers.

The American ships under Commodore Thomas Turner approached and fired warning shots, the Mexicans obviously fired back as the American fleet had no jurisdiction within Mexican waters. Despite the fact of being outnumbered by the American fleet, the Mexican vessels engaged in battle resulting in a bloody encounter Battle of Anton Lizardo and the capture of the conservative ships and over thirty casualties on both sides. The battle played an important role in ending the Reform War with a liberal victory and the signatory of the secret MacLane-Ocampo Treaty where Juarez and the radical liberals agreed on further cessions of Mexican territory to the U.S., as well as a couple of transit concessions through the Tehuantepec Isthmus, and from Tamaulipas across Mexico to the Gulf of California in perpetuity to the U.S. that eventually was rejected by the American congress, as it was determined that the inclusion of these states into the American federation could strengthen the southern confederate states.

Due to the American intervention, the conservatives under General Miramon failed to take Veracruz from the liberals for a second time, which a few years later led Mexico to a French intervention.

Slave trade

Slavers seized by the Home Squadron:

Commanders
 Charles Stewart (1842)
 David Conner (1845–1847)
 Matthew C. Perry (1847–1848)
 Foxhall A. Parker, Sr. (c. 1851)
 John Thomas Newton (1852–1855)
 Charles Stewart McCauley (1855–1856)
 Hiram Paulding (1856–1858)
 Garrett J. Pendergrast (1858–1861)
 William J. McCluney (1859–1860)
 Silas H. Stringham (1861)

References

 

Ship squadrons of the United States Navy
1838 establishments in the United States
1861 disestablishments in the United States